is a Japanese rock band formed in Nagoya in May 1991, initially with the vocalist Kiyoharu, bassist Hitoki and guitarist Shin. The group had a definite influence on the visual kei scene, being credited as inspiration to many bands of the late 1990s visual kei boom and as one of the creators of Nagoya kei. The band achieved success with the albums Feminism (1995) and Fake Star (1996), with the song "Pistol" winning an MTV Video Music Award.

The band suspended activities for an indefinite period on January 29, 1999. Kuroyume was officially disbanded at their final live performance on January 29, 2009. However a year later in January 2010, Kuroyume reunited as a duo consisting of vocalist Kiyoharu and bassist Hitoki.

History

1991-1993
Kuroyume was formed in 1991 by Kiyoharu and Hitoki, former members of Garnet band. They recruited Masaru, who left the band shortly after and was replaced by Shin. After a year of performing live, the band released their debut maxi single, "Chuuzetsu" in 1992 on Haunted House Records. Shortly afterwards, the band released a mini album entitled Ikiteita Chuzetsuji... (remastered from an old demo tape).

A year later, Nakigara O... was released and clearly showed the group progressing in a more melodic direction by leaning further toward the goth side of things and doing away completely with any semblance of metal music. The song "Shin'ai Naru Death Mask" from their first mini album had been rerecorded, and the band's first promotional music video was filmed for the song.

The band during this era is credited with the creator of Nagoya kei sounds with Rouage and Laputa.

1994-1999
Shortly after signing with EMI in early 1994, Kuroyume released their first major label single "For Dear" to promote the forthcoming album Mayoeru Yuritachi. Two promotional videos were filmed, one for the aforementioned single and another for album track "Autism". Mayoeru Yuritachi had a far milder sound than previous releases, probably due to the group signing with EMI.

In late 1994, the mini album Cruel and single "Ice My Life" were released and introduced a pop side. The band now dressed more conservatively, with their new look being reminiscent of 1980s New Romantic fashion, seeming to give off a more palatable image to mainstream buyers. The music on Cruel was again more pop-friendly, but still loud and abrasive, which helped give the new songs a universal appeal.

In 1995, Shin left the group due to musical differences and to focus on his other band Vinyl. From then on, Kuroyume would record and perform as a duo, along with support musicians. The two albums following this rearrangement, 1995's Feminism and 1996's Fake Star, continued the visually oriented mainstream pop rock of Cruel, with the latter of the two having an edgier production and presenting a more fashionable image. Feminism was named one of the top albums from 1989-1998 in a 2004 issue of the music magazine Band Yarouze.

In 1996, Kuroyume won the MTV Japan International Viewer's Choice Award at the 1996 MTV Video Music Awards for the song "Pistol" from Fake Star. From this point onward, the band and particularly Kiyoharu were recognized on a national level.

1997 heralded another transformation for Kuroyume, who were a punk influenced rock 'n roll band both visually and musically for the albums Drug Treatment and Corkscrew. Their releases continued to sell quite well. In 1999, citing Hitoki's personal health difficulties, Kuroyume suspended activities for an indefinite period.

1999-2009: Post-Kuroyume
Kiyoharu formed Sads in 1999. Sads released numerous material until taking a hiatus in 2003, returning in 2010. Hitoki formed a unit called Hitoki-PiranhaHeads in 2000 which had several line-ups and various name changes. In 2004, Hitoki joined Super Drop Babies with former Kuroyume guitarist Shin.

On Kiyoharu's 40th Birthday, October 30, 2008, it was announced that Kuroyume would officially be disbanded on January 29, 2009. That day, the band held their last concert on their fifteenth anniversary, titled "Kuroyume the End".

2010-present: Revival
In 2010, Kiyoharu announced the reformation of Kuroyume and that they have begun recording a new album. The band signed to the Avex label, the same label that housed Kiyoharu's solo work and Sads. Their first single since reforming, "Misery", was set to be released on January 29, 2011, but it was pushed back to February 9, 2011. They then proceeded to release the singles, "Alone" and "Heavenly" on May 25 and August 24, 2011 respectively. Following the relative success of these two singles, they released a new album entitled "Headache and Dub Reel Inch" on November 2, 2011. "Headache and Dub Reel Inch" marked Kuroyume's first album release with Avex.

Fuck the Border Line, a tribute album to Kuroyume, was also released on February 9, 2011, featuring covers of the band's songs by popular modern visual acts, such as Abingdon Boys School, Plastic Tree, The Gazette, Sid and Cascade. The single "Alone" (アロン) was selected by Capcom to be used in the Japanese advertisement campaign for Resident Evil: The Mercenaries 3D.

On March 26, 2014, Kuroyume released a single entitled "Reverb", which peaked at the 11th position on Oricon charts. It was selected by Koei Tecmo and was used for the advertising campaign of Samurai Warriors 4.

Members
Current members
 – lead vocals (1991–1999, 2009, 2010–2015)
 – bass, backing vocals (1991–1999, 2009, 2010–2015)

Former members
 – guitar (1991–1995)
 – drums (1991–1992)
Hiro – drums (1992-1993)

Discography

Singles
 "Chuuzetsu" (July 20, 1992)
 "For Dear" (February 9, 1994)
 "Ice My Life" (July 20, 1994)
 "Yasashi Higeki" (March 8, 1995)
 "Miss Moonlight" (April 26, 1995)
 "Beams" (October 13, 1995)
 "See You" (February 21, 1996)
 "Pistol" (April 17, 1996)
 "Like @ Angel" (November 18, 1996)
 "Nite & Day" (April 10, 1997)
 "Spray" (June 4, 1997)
 "Shounen" (November 19, 1997)
 "Maria" (April 8, 1998)
 "My Strange Days" (March 31, 1999, distributed at "Live or Die")
 "Misery" (February 9, 2011)
 "Alone" (May 25, 2011)
 "Heavenly" (August 24, 2011)
 "Kingdom" (September 6, 2013)
 "Guernika" (December 11, 2013)
 "I Hate Your Popstar Life" (December 11, 2013)
 "Reverb" (March 26, 2014)
 "Day 1" (January 5, 2015)

Studio albums
 Ikiteita Chuzetsuji... (December 25, 1992)
 Nakigara o... (June 11, 1993)
 Mayoeru Yuritachi -Romance of Scarlet-  (March 9, 1994)
 Cruel (August 31, 1994)
 Feminism (May 10, 1995)
 Fake Star ~I'm Just a Japanese Fake Rocker~ (May 29, 1996)
 Drug Treatment (June 27, 1997)
 Corkscrew (May 27, 1998)
 Headache and Dub Reel Inch (November 2, 2011 - first Avex release)
 Kuro to Kage (January 29, 2014)

Live albums
 1997.10.31 Live at Shinjuku Loft (January 16, 1998)
 Kuroyume "the End" -Corckscrew a Go Go! Final- 09.01.29 Budokan  (March 18, 2009)

Compilation albums
 EMI 1994–1998 Best or Worst (February 17, 1999)
 Kuroyume Complete Rare Tracks 1991-1993 -Indies Zenkyokushu- (June 10, 2000)
 Kuroyume Singles (March 27, 2002)
 Kuroyume Complete Singles (September 29, 2003)
 Kuroyume Box (April 28, 2004)

Demo tapes
 "Kuroyume" (August 29, 1991)
 "Ikiteita Chuzetsuji..." (January 25, 1992)

Tribute albums
 Fuck the Border Line (February 9, 2011)

Home videos
 Neo Under (September 5, 1992)
 Under (October 31, 1992)
 Deep Under (December 20, 1993)
 Tanmei no Yuritachi (July 6, 1994)
 Theater of Cruel (September 28, 1994)
 Tour Feminism Part 1 (September 27, 1995)
 Pictures (December 13, 1995)
 Fake Star's Circuit 1996: Boys Only (October 4, 1996)
 1996 Fake Star's Circuit: Yokohama Arena (November 18, 1996)
 1996 Fake Star's Circuit: Tour Document (January 29, 1997)
 Pictures 2 (October 22, 1997)
 Live at Shinjuku Loft (January 16, 1998, reissued on October 29, 2003)
 Live or Die: Corkscrew a Go Go! (March 31, 1999)
 DVD Pictures Vol.1 (October 18, 2000)
 DVD Pictures Vol.2 (October 18, 2000)
 Complete Single Clips (April 13, 2005)
 All Pictures (January 28, 2009)
 The End: Corkscrew a Go Go! Final (March 25, 2009)
 Fuck the Fake Star: The Newest Feather (July 20, 2011)
 Headache and Dub Reel Inch 2012.1.13 Live at 日本武道館 (May 2, 2012)
 黒夢 1.14 (June 13, 2012)

References

External links
 Official website
 Official Avex website
 Official Twitter
 Official MySpace
 Official YouTube

Visual kei musical groups
Japanese gothic rock groups
Japanese punk rock groups
Japanese alternative rock groups
Japanese gothic metal musical groups
Japanese musical duos
Musical groups established in 1991
Musical groups disestablished in 2009
Musical groups reestablished in 2010
Musical groups from Aichi Prefecture
Musical groups from Gifu Prefecture
1991 establishments in Japan
EMI Music Japan artists